Dodge County is a county located in the central portion of the U.S. state of Georgia. As of 2020, the population was 19,925. The county seat is Eastman. Dodge County lies in the Historic South and Black Belt region of Georgia, an area that was devoted to cotton production in the antebellum years. It has significant historic buildings and plantations, has a substantial African-American population, and shows cultural aspects of the South.

History
Prior to 1802, this section of Georgia was owned by the Creek Indians. Treaties were made in 1802-1805 by which all lands east of the Ocmulgee River were taken from the Creek Indians. This land was distributed by lottery to the citizens of Georgia. In 1803 Wilkinson County was organized under that treaty. Telfair and Laurens counties were formed from Wilkinson County. In 1808 Pulaski County was formed from Laurens. In 1869, the Macon and Brunswick Railroad was built. Towns began to spring up all up and down the line, and, as this section was so far removed from the county seat, Hawkinsville, it was deemed expedient to create a new county and place the county seat at this point. A large portion of the county was taken from Laurens County, and also smaller portions from Pulaski, Montgomery, and Telfair counties. Dodge County was organized on October 26, 1870, during the Reconstruction era. The county was named by the Republican-dominated legislature for William E. Dodge. The county courthouse was built by Dodge and used until 1908, on the same area the courthouse stands now.

Geography

The western half of Dodge County, roughly west of Eastman, is located in the Lower Ocmulgee River sub-basin of the Altamaha River basin. The eastern half of the county is located in the Little Ocmulgee River sub-basin of the same Altamaha River basin, with a small northern corner of Dodge County, north and west of Chester, located in the Lower Oconee River sub-basin of the larger Alamaha River basin. The rivers were important for trade, carrying cotton and timber downriver to markets.

Adjacent counties
 Laurens County - northeast
 Wheeler County - east
 Telfair County - southeast
 Wilcox County - west
 Pulaski County - west
 Bleckley County - northwest

Demographics

2020 census

As of the 2020 United States census, there were 19,925 people, 7,628 households, and 5,167 families residing in the county.

2010 census
As of the 2010 United States Census, there were 21,796 people, 8,177 households, and 5,528 families residing in the county. The racial makeup of the county was 66.8% white, 29.8% black or African American, 0.5% Asian, 0.3% American Indian, 0.1% Pacific islander, 1.6% from other races, and 1.0% from two or more races. Those of Hispanic or Latino origin made up 3.4% of the population. In terms of ancestry, 33.5% were English, and 12.9% were American.

Of the 8,177 households, 33.6% had children under the age of 18 living with them, 45.7% were married couples living together, 16.4% had a female householder with no husband present, 32.4% were non-families, and 28.7% of all households were made up of individuals. The average household size was 2.43 and the average family size was 2.96. The median age was 38.5 years.

The median income for a household in the county was $33,580 and the median income for a family was $46,460. Males had a median income of $38,050 versus $28,418 for females. The per capita income for the county was $16,288. About 17.1% of families and 20.0% of the population were below the poverty line, including 22.7% of those under age 18 and 18.1% of those age 65 or over.

Transportation

Major highways

  U.S. Route 23
  U.S. Route 280
  U.S. Route 319
  U.S. Route 341
  U.S. Route 341 Business
  U.S. Route 441
  State Route 27
  State Route 27 Business
  State Route 30
  State Route 31
  State Route 46
  State Route 46 Connector
  State Route 87
  State Route 117
  State Route 126
  State Route 165
  State Route 230
  State Route 257

Airport

The Heart of Georgia Regional Airport is located three miles east of Eastman off of State Route 46. Elevation 304'. Runway 02/20 is 6,506'x100'and has a precision instrument landing system. The airport is owned by the Heart of Georgia Regional Airport Authority and is home to the Middle Georgia State College Georgia Aviation campus. Middle Georgia State College operates the Federal Aviation Administration's #1 ranked student control tower in the United States. Other businesses at the airport include aircraft manufacturing, aircraft metal finishing, and general metal fabrication. The airport's fixed-base operator is located in the terminal building midfield. The terminal building is named after W. S. Stuckey Sr., founder of Stuckey's Candy Company (now Standard Candy) an aviation pioneer who is from Eastman.

Education

Communities

Cities
 Chauncey
 Eastman
 Milan

Towns
 Chester
 Rhine

Unincorporated communities
 Empire
 Plainfield
 Ontario

Politics

Vote-buying controversy 

Dodge County has been at the center of several voter fraud and vote buying controversies over the past several decades.

1990s 
The most notable incident of voter fraud in Dodge County in the 1990s is the case of United States vs. McCranie. In this case, there were two defendants being tried together for several different methods of voter fraud. These methods included vote buying, vote selling, multiple voting, and votes cast by felons and deceased voters. The case involved the winners of the July 9, 1996, races for Dodge County Sheriff and Dodge County Commissioner. The races were decided by 9 votes and 31 votes, respectively. The original results of the election had been contested, and a secondary election took place in an attempt to resolve the issue. In the secondary election, the Dodge County Sheriff's race was overturned, but the results of the Dodge County Commissioner's race remained the same.

A joint federal-state investigation into the events of this election found that the defendants likely worked together to buy votes. This was backed up with bank records that showed that the defendants had each obtained $15,000 in cash in $20 bills from the Bank of Eastman. The two defendants were accused of voter fraud and sentenced on March 12, 1999. Many federal officials described the 1996 election trial as the largest election-fraud prosecution in United States history.

2000s
The most notable case of voter fraud in the 2000s is the case of the 2004 Dodge County Sheriff's race. Former Dodge County Sheriff Lawton Douglas Jr. was indicted on two counts of conspiracy and four counts of vote buying in July 2009. This indictment came due to an investigation of the 2004 election, and did not include any charges for the potentially fraudulent 2008 election. Former Sheriff Lawton Douglas received a maximum sentence. The sentencing cited Douglas's use of cash, liquor, and drugs to buy votes in the election. Also, Douglas had people accompany voters into the polling booths to ensure that the vote actually went to him. His sentence was 18 months in federal prison.

Election results

See also

 National Register of Historic Places listings in Dodge County, Georgia
List of counties in Georgia

References

External links
 Dodge County
 Dodge County historical marker

 
1870 establishments in Georgia (U.S. state)
Georgia (U.S. state) counties
Populated places established in 1870